William "Brer" Jones was an American Negro league outfielder in the 1930s.

Jones played for the Atlanta Black Crackers in 1932. In three recorded games, he posted two hits in 12 plate appearances.

References

External links
 and Seamheads

Year of birth missing
Year of death missing
Place of birth missing
Place of death missing
Atlanta Black Crackers players